The Nilambe Dam is a small hydroelectric dam build across the Nilambe River, measuring approximately  in length. The power station consists of two  generating units, which were commissioned in July 1988.

See also 

 List of dams and reservoirs in Sri Lanka
 List of power stations in Sri Lanka

References 

Dams completed in 1988
Dams in Sri Lanka
Hydroelectric power stations in Sri Lanka
Gravity dams
Buildings and structures in Kandy District